Chen Yu may refer to:

Chen Yu (badminton) (born 1980), Chinese badminton player
Chen Yu (information scientist) (born 1944), Chinese information scientist and information economist
Chen Yu (synchronised swimmer) (born 1981), Chinese synchronised swimmer
Chen Yu (politician) (1901–1974), Chinese politician, Governor of Guangdong, 1957–1967
Pen name of Tian Han (1898–1968), Chinese playwright